Lahore News HD is a local television channel in Lahore, Pakistan. The channel transmits local news, current affairs, sports, arts, events and entertainment. It is part of Dunya Media Group. The Group also owns Dunya News Urdu news channel and Daily Dunya daily Urdu newspaper.

History

Lahore News HD launched at 7:00 pm on the 1 February 2017. The channel is owned by National Communication Services (NCS) Pvt. Limited,

The channel broadcasts on the Paksat R1 at following frequency:

Orbit Position: 38.0 E

down link frequency: 3792 MHz

Polarity: Vertical

Symbol Rate: 5700 SPs/6

Modulation: 8PSK

FEC Rate: 3/5 DVB s/2

Video PID: 33

Audio PID:34

Lahore News HD broadcasts from studios at 8 A abbot Road in Lahore, which is also the headquarters of Dunya News and Daily Dunya newspapers, both owned by NCS. Lahore News is the first local Channel using HD technology,

Programmes

1. Roshni (Religious show) daily (7am to 8am)
2. Jaago Lahore (Morning Show) daily 9am to 11am
3. Juram Anjam (Crime show) Mon – Wed (7pm to 8pm)
4. Bhoojo to Jeeto (Road Show) Thru – Sun (7pm to 8pm)
5. TopStory (Current Affairs, Talk Show) Mon – Fri (8pm to 9pm)
6. Banam Thakt e Lahore (Development and Social issue based show) Sat – Sun (8pm to 9pm)
7. Bina Mazzrat (Analysis Based Crruent Affairs show) Mon – Fri (10pm to 11pm)
8. Mehman e Khas (A celebrity based show) Sat – Sun (10pm to 11pm)
9. Tamasha (Investigative stories) Mon – thru (11pm to 12am)

News 
Lahore News HD broadcasts News Headline after every hour, and News bulletin after two hours. Regular live reports, travel and weather updates feature throughout.

References

External links

Television stations in Pakistan
Lahore